William Edward O'Brien (March 10, 1831 – December 21, 1914) was a lawyer, farmer, militia officer, editor and political figure in Ontario, Canada. He represented Muskoka and Parry Sound in the House of Commons of Canada from 1882 to 1896 as a Conservative member.

Biography 
He was born in Thornhill, Upper Canada, the son of Edward G. O'Brien, an immigrant from Ireland, and was educated at Upper Canada College. In 1864, he married Elizabeth Loring, a descendant of United Empire Loyalist Joshua Loring. He was called to the Ontario bar in 1874. O'Brien was an unsuccessful candidate for a seat in the House of Commons in 1878. An officer in the Canadian Militia, O'Brien was the lieutenant-colonel of the 35th Simcoe Foresters and would command the York and Simcoe Provisional Battalion during the North-West Rebellion of 1885. In 1889, O'Brien introduced a motion in the House of Commons that the Jesuit Estates Act, which had been passed by the Quebec assembly, be struck down by the federal parliament; that motion was defeated. He was defeated when he ran for reelection in 1896.

References 
 WILLIAM EDWARD O’BRIEN - GREYSIMCOEFORESTERS
 YORK SIMCOE BATTALION 1885 - GREYSIMCOEFORESTERS
 The Canadian parliamentary companion, 1891, AJ Gemmill

1831 births
1914 deaths
Members of the House of Commons of Canada from Ontario
Conservative Party of Canada (1867–1942) MPs

Canadian Militia officers